The Lynx is a German armoured fighting vehicle developed by Rheinmetall Landsysteme (part of Rheinmetall's Vehicle Systems division). The Lynx, configured as a KF31 infantry fighting vehicle (IFV), was unveiled at the Eurosatory defence exhibition on 14 June 2016. The KF41 variant was unveiled at the Eurosatory defence exhibition on 12 June 2018. According to Rheinmetall, the Lynx family of tracked armoured vehicles is at the forefront of a new trend in IFV design toward armoured vehicles with lower unit and through-life costs and reduced complexity. One of the key principles of the Lynx concept is the integration of proven sub-systems with a high technology readiness level to reduce development time, cost and technical risk.

Development 
The Lynx family has been designed as a highly protected tracked armoured vehicle to fill a gap identified in the market by Rheinmetall. Lynx was designed as a private venture by Rheinmetall to provide customers with a modern fighting vehicle that will be able to counter emerging near peer threats whilst maintaining the ability to conduct asymmetric or peace-keeping operations. It was first shown publicly in June 2016, and in the lighter KF31 configuration.

On 4 June 2018 Rheinmetall issued a press release informing that the larger Lynx KF41 would debut twice in different configurations at the upcoming Eurosatory defence exhibition later that month. Following the unveiling in IFV configuration on 12 June the vehicle was reconfigured as a command variant, which was unveiled on 13 June. The First configuration would be as an infantry fighting vehicle with the new Lance 2.0 turret, and then after refitting on site, configured as command variant.

As of May 2020 Rheinmetall had confirmed the company had proposed the Lynx to meet requirements in Australia, the Czech Republic, and the United States, and as of March 2022 these requirements were ongoing. The first user of the Lynx was announced as Hungary on 10 September 2020.

The Lynx Combat Support Vehicle (CSV) was unveiled on 18 October 2021. The Lynx CSV was designed to meet the Australian Army's Land 400 Phase 3 requirement for approximately 100 support vehicles capable of fulfilling the manoeuvre support, logistics, repair, and recovery roles. It was expected that the CSV variant will be marketed to other potential export customers, including Hungary and the US.

The Lynx 120 was announced by the company in February 2022. The Lynx 120 is a fire support variant of the Lynx KF41 platform. It consists of a Lynx KF41 hull mounting a large-calibre crewed turret armed with a derivative of Rheinmetall's 120 mm smoothbore gun family.

Design and mobility 
The Lynx is built around a sponson-shaped hull with a long, shallow glacis and angled belly plate. The driver compartment is at the front left, the engine the front right, fighting compartment in the middle (when fitted with a turret) and there is a dismount compartment at the rear, access to which is via a ramp in the rear of the vehicle. A key feature of the Lynx design concept is the separation and modularity of the vehicle into two primary parts: the basic vehicle and specialist mission and role equipment. Lynx variants are designed around a common drive module upon which the mission kits are installed. Available kits include an IFV and APC. For the former, a turret is fitted to the roof of the hull, for the latter the turret is removed and replaced by a roof plate that includes an array of vision devices and a remote weapon station. It is understood that this transformation can be carried out near to, or in the field, within eight hours. Other variants have been developed, or will be developed. Those developed and shown include a Combat Support Vehicle and a 120 mm-armed fire support vehicle. Variants to be developed include a mortar carrier with 120mm mortar, an ambulance, a C2/C3 vehicle, and an air defence variant.

The Lynx's overall design layout is conventional, the front right located powerpack consisting of a Liebherr D9612 diesel engine coupled to either an Allison X300 series 6F/1R or Renk HSWL 256 automatic transmission. The Liebherr diesel is of the common rail type and fitted with a two-stage turbocharger and two-stage intercooler. Power output when fitted to the Lynx varies from 755 hp (KF31) to 1,140 hp (KF41), although the actual engine is rated at up to 1,475 hp. The exhaust (right) and engine cooling (left) are routed to the rear of the vehicle to reduce its thermal and acoustic signature. Final drives are mounted in the front and the toothless idler sprockets with track tensioners are mounted at the rear. The running gear has six road wheel stations per side, which guide a lightweight steel or segmented rubber band-type track. The rubber-tyred road wheels are mounted on a suspension system comprising swing arms with conventional torsion bars and a SupaShock damper systems, this set-up is proven to be reliable and cost-efficient.
The Lynx is fitted with as many mature sub-systems as possible in order to facilitate maintenance. The KF41 transmission is the same as that used in the Puma and Ajax vehicles, the Liebherr engine is widely used in the construction industry, and the driver’s station is taken from the Kodiak armoured engineering vehicle. The NBC system is the same as that installed on Boxer and the tracks are identical to those used on the PzH 2000.

Mobility parameters will vary by variant and exact configuration but are stated to include a maximum road speed of 70 km/h, a gradeability of at least 60%, a sideslope traverse capability of at least 30%, the ability to climb (forwards) a 1 m vertical obstacle, the ability to cross a 2.5 m trench, and an unprepared fording depth of 1.5 m. Operational range on 900-litres of diesel fuel is 500 km.

The driver is located to the left front side of the hull and is furnished with three periscopes, one of which can be replaced with a night vision alternative. The rear crew compartment is designed as a mission neutral space with the incorporation of C-rails and a pattern of universal fixing points on the walls and floor. This provides a flexible configuration for all mission specific equipment. A large power-operated rear ramp allows for rapid ingress/egress of dismounts. For the CSV variant the most prominent design change is the removal of the turret and the alteration of the rear of the vehicle to provide a lowered loadbed for cargo to be transported on. In addition a 5 tonne capacity crane has been installed in the centre of the vehicle for cargo manipulation. The remaining internal volume below the loadbed is understood to house additional fuel tanks and storage for specialist equipment.

Protection 
The protection of the Lynx is designed to be scaled according to the threat. The vehicle's ballistic steel armour is designed to protect the Lynx from anti-tank weapons, medium-caliber ammunition, artillery shrapnel and bomblets, although exact details are classified. The interior is fitted with a spall liner to protect the crew, while the vehicle also features decoupled seats in addition to mine and IED protection packages that include a double floor. The standard armour configuration is designated the Mounted Combat Operations (MCO) kit and it is intended to offer vehicle protection against similarly armed opponents. It is understood to combine an advanced passive component with active protection systems. The second kit is designated the Complex Urban Environment (CUE) kit and excludes any active protection elements. Lynx is understood to be available with one further armour kit that can be used for air transportation, providing a vehicle that can deploy straight from a transport aircraft.

Additional active protection can be provided for shaped charge warhead attack using Rheinmetall's Active Protection System AMAP-ADS. A range of passive protection and defensive aids are also available. They include a rapid obscuration system (ROSY), laser warning system and acoustic shot locator system. These are integrated in the Lance turret when it is fitted along with automatic target recognition and automatic target tracking. 

The heating, cooling and nuclear, biological and chemical filtration system is combined in an environmental control system stowed in the rear-located left sponson in front of the cooling system. Air ducts lead to the floor and to an air duct interface on the top end of the hull.

Armament 
The vehicle as shown at Eurosatory 2016 was outfitted with a Lance turret mounting a stabilized, externally powered, autocannon of 30 mm or 35 mm caliber, with airburst munition support. This allows the Lynx to engage targets at ranges of up to 3,000 meters, both when static and when on the move. The vehicle's main armament has an elevation of between +45˚ and −10˚ and has a controlled rate of fire of 200 rounds per minute. Mounted coaxial to the right is the latest Rheinmetall Machine Gun (RMG) 7.62 mm, which can fire standard 7.62 × 51 mm NATO ammunition and has a maximum rate of fire of 800 rounds a minute. The turret has manual back-up in case of power failure.

The vehicle can also mount an optional anti-tank guided missile launcher. The demonstrator vehicle at Eurosatory 2016 was outfitted with a twin-round launcher for the Spike-LR anti-tank guided missile.

The IFV variant of the KF41 variant shown at Eurosatory 2018 was fitted with the updated Lance 2.0 turret, this having flexible mission pods fitted on the left and right sides so that a variety of subsystems can be installed to provide the turret with specialist capabilities.

The Lynx 120 fire support variant is armed with a derivative of Rheinmetall's 120 mm smoothbore gun family that is capable of firing the DM11 programmable HE round. A light machine gun is mounted co-axially with the main armament, and a RWS armed with a 12.7 mm heavy machine gun is installed on the rear of the turret roof behind the commander's panoramic sight. A row of eight Wegmann 76 mm smoke dischargers is also installed on either side of the turret behind the two hatches.

Variants 
The Lynx family of tracked armoured vehicles is based around two primary models, the KF31 and a slightly larger but considerably heavier KF41. Both models can be configured for a variety of roles that include command and control, armoured reconnaissance, surveillance, repair, recovery or ambulance operations in addition to infantry fighting vehicle configuration.

Kettenfahrzeug 31 (KF31)
This model, first displayed at Eurosatory 2016, has a maximum permissible gross vehicle weight of 35 to 38 tonnes, is 7.22 meters long and can carry a crew of three plus six passengers. Powered by a  engine, the vehicle can reach a top speed of 65 km/h.

Kettenfahrzeug 41 (KF41)
This model, as displayed for the first time at Eurosatory 2018, has a maximum permissible gross vehicle weight of up to 50 tonnes. The KF41 can carry a crew of three plus eight passengers. The KF41 is being offered to the Australian Army for the Land 400 program. In December 2020, the first of three KF41s were sent to Australia for testing under the Land 400 program. If successful, Australia will purchase a total of 450 KF41s for a total of $18.1 billion AUD ($13.30 billion USD).

Variants
Variants shown as of March 2022 include the Lynx 120 that was first shown in February 2022, the Lynx Combat Support Vehicle that was first shown in October 2021, and the APC/command configuration which was shown as an overnight conversion from a KF41 at Eurosatory 2018. Variants that have been announced as to be developed (for Hungary) are a mortar carrier with 120mm mortar, an ambulance, a C2/C3 vehicle, and an air defence variant with cannon. Other variants will require development if contracts are won and these will include logistics and ammunition transporters.

Gallery

Operators

Current operators
218 vehicles on order. On 17 August 2020 the government of Hungary and Rheinmetall Group signed a contract to start manufacturing the Lynx infantry fighting vehicle family in Hungary. Few other details emerged at the time about the deal, which is part of Hungary’s Zrinyi 2026 rearmament programme launched in 2017.On 10 September 2020 Rheinmetall and the Government of Hungary held a joint press conference in Budapest and among the details of the new joint manufacturing project they announced that a new factory, along with an almost three square kilometer-sized full-service vehicle test track called ZALA Zone, would be built near Zalaegerszeg, Hungary. Rheinmetall's press release of 10 September 2020 confirmed that the Hungarian Ministry of Defence had awarded Rheinmetall an order to supply tracked armoured vehicles and related products and services with a total value of more than €2 billion. The contract covers 218 Lynx infantry fighting vehicles fitted with Rheinmetall's manned 30mm Lance turret. The larger/heavier Lynx KF41 has been selected by Hungary. The award also includes nine Leopard 2 based Buffalo armoured recovery vehicles, plus additional products and services that include simulators, training and instruction, plus an initial supply of spare parts as well as maintenance support. During a first phase of production, Hungary is to receive forty-six Lynx plus the nine Buffalo ARVs, with delivery to be complete by the start of 2023. These vehicles will be built in Germany, but for the second production phase an additional 172 Lynx will be built in Hungary. To this end, it was confirmed the Hungarian government and Rheinmetall had agreed in August 2020 to establish a joint venture responsible for creating a Lynx production facility in Hungary, to be financed by a local company.:A government document published in June 2021 talks about 256 Lynx IFVs being ordered. It also mentions the development and production of an air-defence variant using the Lynx chassis.:The factory building near Zalaegerszeg is ready, the tooling is under installation, the production starts late 2022, early 2023 with a planned production rate of 50 Lynx vehicles / year. Rheinmetall are reportedly going to develop and deliver the following versions for the Hungarian Army:
 Infantry fighting vehicles (IFV), 
 Reconnaissance, 
 Joint fire observer,
 Mortar Carrier with 120mm mortar
 Ambulance
 C2/C3 vehicle
 Driver training vehicles
 Air Defence variant with autocannon (SPAAG) especially designed to counter drones. Most likely SkyRanger 30, which is still in development phase.

The first serial production Lynx IFV was officially handed over to the Hungarian Army on the 15th of October, 2022.
The production of the first Hungarian-made Lynx IFV has started in Rheinmetall's newly built Zalaegereszeg plant on 12nd of January, 2023.

Potential operators

Rheinmetall has submitted the Lynx KF41 for the Australian Defence Force's Land 400 Phase 3 program (also known as the Mounted Close Combat Capability), the Request for Tender (RFT) for which was released on 24 August 2018. Land 400 Phase 3 will replace the Australian Army's M113AS4 armoured personnel carriers (APCs) with up to 450 infantry fighting vehicles (IFVs) and 17 manoeuvre support vehicles. In mid-September 2019, Rheinmetall's Lynx KF41 Infantry Fighting Vehicle (IFV) and Hanwha's AS21 Redback IFV were shortlisted for consideration for the Australian Army’s project Land 400 Phase 3. Down-selection of a preferred tenderer that will be presented to the government for consideration is expected during 2022 and following that an initial operating capability of the selected platform is expected to be reached in 2024–2025, while final operating capability is expected by 2030–2031. Rheinmetall has also responded to a request for information on the procurement of another 117 vehicles under the Land 400 programme, these configured as logistics, mortar carries with direct fire capabilities, mortar ammo providers, and protected amphibious platforms.

Rheinmetall has offered to set up a production line in Greece for Lynx KF41 armoured fighting vehicles if the Hellenic Army selects it as its replacement infantry fighting vehicle for the now aging M113s and BMP-1s. The offer also includes a production line for upgrading the existing Leopard 2A4 of the Hellenic Army to the 2A7+ standard.
Greece agrees procurement of 205 KF41 lynx IFVs and 123 upgraded Leopard 2A4 tanks.

In March 2022 the Iraqi government started negotiations in order to purchase Lynx IFVs for its military.

In October 2018, Rheinmetall announced a teaming with Raytheon to propose the Lynx KF41 to the U.S. Army in answer to its developing Next-Generation Combat Vehicle program, this slated to replace the Bradley Fighting Vehicles and other current platforms. This program, now known as the Optionally Manned Fighting Vehicle program, was halted on 16 January 2020. The U.S. stated it was cancelling the OMFV prototyping competition in order to revisit the requirements and acquisition timeline. After revamping the OMFV competition the army moved ahead with a new plan that now has five companies – American Rheinmetall Vehicle, BAE Systems, General Dynamics Land Systems (GDLS), Oshkosh Defense, and Point Blank Enterprises – participating in a concept design phase. This portion of the programme will end around mid-2022 and the army will take a three to five month ‘break' to evaluate bids from all companies interested in competing in the next two phases of the competition. The army then plans to award three contracts for phase 3 (detailed design) and phase 4 (prototype build and test) activities. Combined, these two phases will cover 54-months and each company will be tasked with delivering 12 prototypes, as well as several ballistic hulls and turrets, armour coupons, ballistic kits, and data. Then in 2027 the army intends to select one of these competing companies to proceed with low-rate initial production in anticipation of reaching the first unit equipped milestone in 2029, and full rate production in 2030.

In 2023, Rheinmetall announced Ukraine expressed Interest in the Lynx and the KF51.

Unsuccessful bids 
The Lynx KF41 is known to have been unsuccessfully proposed to meet the requirements of the Czech Republic and Slovakia. In June 2022 Slovakia announced it would acquire the BAE Systems CV90 Mk IV, and in July 2022 the Czech Republic announced it was also hoping to acquire the CV90 Mk IV. The Czech procurement negotiations, while a separate project, will be coordinated with those of Slovakia

See also 
 Marder
 Puma
 Combat Vehicle 90
 ASCOD
 Ajax
 K21
 Kurganets-25
 Hunter AFV

References

External links 

 Lynx on Rheinmetall's website
 AUSA 2018 – Lynx KF41/Bradley A4 comparison
 Eurosatory 2018: Lynx KF41 "Command" variant – debut and unveiling
 Christopher Foss of Jane's talks about the Lynx at Eurosatory 2016
 Official Rheinmetall video of Lynx IFV
 Unveil of Lynx at Eurosatory 2016

Rheinmetall
Infantry fighting vehicles
Tracked infantry fighting vehicles
Armoured fighting vehicles of Germany